Samuli Aro (born 12 April 1975 in Järvenpää) is a Finnish enduro rider. He is a five-time World Enduro Champion and has also won the International Six Days Enduro (ISDE) World Trophy with Team Finland five times.

Aro debuted in the World Enduro Championship in 1998, and took his first world title in 2002 with Husqvarna in the 250 cc class. After moving to KTM for the 2003 season, he placed second in the championship behind Honda's Stefan Merriman. He went on to win the World Enduro Championship three times in a row; in 2004 in the Enduro 3 class, and in 2005 and 2006 in the Enduro 2 class. In the 2008 season, after a second place to Honda rider Mika Ahola in 2007, Aro became one of the few enduro riders to win five world championship titles. He retired from the world championship after the 2009 season, during which he placed fourth in the standings.

Career summary

ISDE

References

External links 
 Official website

Enduro riders
Finnish motorcycle racers
People from Järvenpää
1975 births
Living people